The St. Vincent National Wildlife Refuge is part of the United States National Wildlife Refuge System, located in northwestern Florida, on the barrier island of St. Vincent, off the coast of Apalachicola in the Gulf of Mexico. The Refuge includes Pig Island (46 acres, undeveloped), located in the southwest corner of St. Joseph Bay, nearly 9 miles west of St. Vincent and 86 acres of mainland Florida along Franklin county road 30A. The 12,490 acre (51km2) refuge was established in 1968. 

The purpose of the Refuge is to provide habitat for migratory birds including some endangered species. About 277 bird species use the islands as a migratory stopping point annually. The two islands, St. Vincent Island and Pig Island are open for recreational activities and are accessible only by boat. The islands contain undeveloped trails and beaches. Public huts are available for overnight camping. There is no visitor center, drinking water or restroom on the islands.

History 
The earliest documented people to utilized the land date to the year 240 (from pottery shards) when Native Americans lived on the island.  After European settlers displaced the local Native Americans, St. Vincent Island had numerous owners of European Ancestry. At one point in the 1940s, it was stocked with non-native species such as zebra, sambar deer, eland, black buck, ring-necked pheasant, Asian junglefowl, bobwhite quail and wild turkey. 

The island was purchased by The Nature Conservancy in 1968 for $2.2 million and U.S. Fish and Wildlife repaid them with proceeds from Duck Stamp sales and the St. Vincent National Wildlife Refuge was established.

Climate
The climate is mild and subtropical, typical of the Gulf Coast, with an average annual rainfall of 57 inches.

Wildlife
Depending on the season, many species can be observed; a number of them are endangered or threatened. In the spring, several species on the island nest and go through reproductive ritual behavior such as osprey, softshell turtle and wood duck. During this season, white-tailed deer bucks shed their antlers and young bald eagles fledge. In the summer, loggerhead sea turtles lay eggs on the beach and alligators nest in the marshes. Summer bird species includes wood stork, snowy plover and American oystercatcher. During the fall, the islands experience the highest rate of migration stop-overs. This may include peregrine falcons.  White-tailed deer rut happens in the winter season. In winter, waterfowl are most numerous; bald eagles and great horned owls nest. Year-round inhabitants include alligators, other reptiles and many other animal species..

Role in Red Wolf Recovery Program
Since 1990, St. Vincent National Wildlife Refuge has been a breeding ground for endangered red wolves. The wolves are allowed to roam the island and once the pups are weaned by their mother, the pups are taken to Alligator River National Wildlife Refuge in North Carolina.

Activities
Activities include sea kayaking, boating destination, fishing, and birding. People may hike and bike on interior paths. Not all roads are still in use, and only the main road (B Road) is lined with oyster shells for easier travel over the sandy soil of the island. Wildlife viewing as well as fishing from one of the four lakes stocked with largemouth bass and bluegill are also popular on the island. Visitors should practice leave no trace principles on the island.

Hunting
Annual primitive hunts help keep the population of sambar deer, white-tailed deer, feral hogs, and raccoons in check. Licenses for hunts are awarded by lottery and are managed by the Florida Fish and Wildlife Commission. Three public hunts are held each year between November and January. The Refuge is closed to the general public during hunts.

Fire management
Fire is a natural part of the ecosystems in North America. Before St. Vincent Island was altered with roads, lightning would ignite a fire that could burn throughout the islands various habitats. Now when lightning starts a fire, the refuge fire staff decides where to stop the wildfire. Refuge staff use tactics that minimize damage to the hydrology of the island. These tactics may include using water, building control lines or using a controlled fire called a back fire against the wildfire. Fire staff also ignite planned burns called prescribed burns to mimic the lightning fires. Mimicking the lightning fires with prescribed fires achieves the same results as the naturally occurring wildfires. Fire reduces the amount of live and dead leaves from flammable fire-dependent plants, which reduces the potential damage of a wildfire.

Access
The closest boat ramp to the island is a quarter mile away at the end of Indian Pass Rd (County Rd 30B) and is open to the public. Indian Pass is located 22 miles west of Apalachicola. Boaters should be sensitive to winds, tide fluctuations, currents, storms, and oyster bars. Private shuttle services to the island are available from local boat captains. No fees (except for hunts) or passes are needed to visit the island. All units are open to the public, except a portion of the Refuge on the mainland known as the '11 Mile Site' for its location on 11 Mile Rd.

Gallery

References

External links
 
 St. Vincent National Wildlife Refuge at U.S. Fish and Wildlife Service
 St. Vincent National Wildlife Refuge at Gorp.com

Protected areas of Franklin County, Florida
Protected areas of Gulf County, Florida
National Wildlife Refuges in Florida
Protected areas established in 1968
Wetlands of Florida
Landforms of Franklin County, Florida
Landforms of Gulf County, Florida